Numbers is the second studio album by American hip hop duo MellowHype. It was released on October 9, 2012. This was their only release under a major label. The album also contains appearances from Odd Future members Frank Ocean, Mike G and Earl Sweatshirt. The album was briefly the number one rap album on iTunes, before being overtaken by The Heist by Macklemore & Ryan Lewis.

Singles
The album's first single, "La Bonita", was released on July 18, 2012. The full version of the track was released through iTunes on August 28, 2012, along with a music video on August 29, 2012.

On October 4, 2012, the album's second single, "Grill", was released through Odd Future's official SoundCloud. The music video for "Break" was released on November 27, 2012.

Track listing
 All songs produced by Left Brain, except where noted

Notes
 "Snare" contains background vocals from Chloe Clancy and Destiny Valadez

Personnel 
 MellowHype
 Left Brain – executive producer, rapping
 Hodgy Beats – executive producer, rapping
 Tyler, the Creator – co-producer on "666"
 Michael Einziger – co-producer on "P2", drums on "Monster", guitar on "P2"
 Chloe Clancy – background vocals on "Snare"
 Destiny Valadez – background vocals on "Snare"
 L-Boy – background vocals on "Untitled L"
 Daniel Hardaway – trumpet on "Brain"
 Frank Ocean – guest vocals on "Astro"
 Mike G – guest vocals on "666"
 Earl Sweatshirt – guest vocals on "P2"

Charts

Weekly charts

Year-end charts

References

2012 albums
Albums produced by Left Brain
West Coast hip hop albums
Albums produced by Tyler, the Creator